Baltersan Castle is a ruined L-plan tower house located near Maybole, South Ayrshire, Scotland. It was originally graded as a Category B listed building in 1971, but this was upgraded to Category A in 1995. It is currently for sale and is listed as at moderate risk by the Buildings at Risk Register for Scotland.

History
The site was originally occupied by Baltersan House, owned by Egidia Blair, Lady Row, who died in 1530. After her death, the house was demolished. The remains of her tomb can be seen in nearby Crossraguel Abbey. Her will survives and shows she was a generous benefactor to the Abbey, relatives, friends and neighbours. The inscription above the door tell us that the existing tower-house was built on the site in 1584, the work of John Kennedy of Pennyglen (near Maybole) and Margaret Cathcart, his spouse.

Timothy Pont's 16th-century description of Baltersan described the castle as 

John Kennedy, "apparent of Baltersan", the heir, was a royal servant in 1601.

In 1721, the castle passed into the hands of Captain Hugh Arbuthnot, cousin to John Kennedy of Baltersan. By the middle of the 18th century, the castle had become abandoned and remains so to the present day.

The castle was featured in an episode of Dragons' Den in 2005 in which the owner presented his restoration plans and time share financing strategy. As of September 2020, the castle is for sale, and in need of restoration.

Description
The castle is a three-storey L-plan castle with an attic and garret. Its walls measure  in thickness. It has a vaulted ground floor and ashlar turrets on the northwestern and southeastern angles that are provided with gun loops.

References

External links

YouTube video of the Dragon's Den programme

Ruined castles in Scotland
Tower houses in Scotland